Dawlat Khan is an Afghan cricketer. He made his Twenty20 debut for Amo Sharks in the 2017 Shpageeza Cricket League on 17 September 2017.

References

External links
 

Year of birth missing (living people)
Living people
Afghan cricketers
Amo Sharks cricketers
Place of birth missing (living people)